Prunum apicinum is a species of small sea snail, a marine gastropod mollusk in the family Marginellidae, the margin snails.

Description

Distribution
P. apicinum can be found in Atlantic waters, ranging from North Carolina to the Virgin Islands.

References

External links
 

Marginellidae
Gastropods described in 1828